Łukasz Wiech (born 25 March 1997) is a Polish professional footballer who plays as a centre-back for Wisła Puławy.

Senior career
Wiech started his career coming through the Śląsk Wrocław youth system. In 2016, Wiech played for the Śląsk second team in the III liga. In 2017 he moved to Górnik Łęczna on loan. The loan was successful, however he suffered a knee injury at the end of his loan with Górnik which put him out of contention for 6 months, hampering any chance of another loan or a chance in the first team.

On 22 September 2020, he signed a one-year contract with Radomiak Radom.

References

External links
 

1997 births
Sportspeople from Lublin
Living people
Polish footballers
Poland youth international footballers
Association football defenders
Śląsk Wrocław players
Górnik Łęczna players
Ruch Chorzów players
Radomiak Radom players
Wisła Puławy players
I liga players
II liga players
III liga players